Veganz Group AG (formerly Veganz GmbH) is a vegan brand headquartered in Berlin, Germany. Veganz was founded as the first vegan supermarket chain in Europe.

As of 2020, Veganz offers around 165 products in 26 countries, as well as in online stores. Based in Germany, the company opened its first store in Berlin Prenzlauer Berg, in the summer of 2011, with 250 square meters of space. Since July 2017, Veganz has four branches, three in Berlin and one in Prague.

The group turnover increased by 28% to 26.6 million Euros in the whole of 2019.  Veganz employs around 64 people. The company motto is "" (Good for you, better for everyone).

Development and history 
Veganz was founded in 2010 by Jan Bredack, a former senior manager at Mercedes Benz and his former wife Juliane Kindler, a heartfelt vegan. Wanting to simplify vegan food shopping by bundling vegan products in one sales point, they started to build a chain of vegan supermarkets. When the company opened its first store in Berlin, Bredack told the Berliner Zeitung that he had anticipated 100 customers a day, but instead averaged 400. More supermarkets were opened across Europe, but the sales volume declined and the concept proved ineffective.  

The imminent extinction of this business branch caused a change in strategy and Veganz began to transition into a wholesaler, starting its own production in 2015. The supermarket branch was declared bankrupt. Since 2016, Veganz' main business consists of distribution and wholesale, with a small remaining side business of three supermarkets in Berlin and one in Prague.

In 2019, the GmbH turned into an AG and issued bonds in 2020 with an initial interest rate of 7.5%. This step enabled the raise of funds for further growth and international expansion.

Products and customers

Veganz supermarkets sell only vegan goods. In their own Veganz outlets, the company offers an assortment of over 4,500 products from more than 30 countries to their customers, including 45 different kinds of plant milk and cream, vegan ice-creams, vegan cheeses such as Happy Cheeze (now Dr Mannah's), mayonnaise and other dressings, mock meats, fish substitutes such as veggie fish steaks, breads, pastries, and 80 vegan cheeses. There is vegan chocolate, biscuits, sweets, food for companion animals, coffee, toiletries and cosmetics. 85 percent of the sold products are certified organic.

In the spring of 2015, the company launched their own brand for vegan products. By the end of the year, a product range of around 50 plant-based products was available, with about 100 more to follow in 2016. Today, Veganz is one of the few companies worldwide that offer a full range of vegan products. Their assortment includes sweets, meat-, fish- and cheese alternatives, protein products, breakfast items, chilled goods and frozen food. All products are strictly plant-based and a large part is certified organic.

Veganz has plant-based alternatives, such as 'The Gourmet', a mock-cheese based on cashews that won the PETA vegan food award in 2020. Veganz further launched a vegan smoked salmon alternative based on Atlantic seaweed. This global novelty is low in CO2 in production, protecting the world's fish stocks and at the same time outperforming conventional salmon in its omega-3 share.

According to Bredack, most of his customers are between 18 and 34 years old, although the over-55 age group is increasing. About 60 percent of the store customers are vegan and 10 percent of them are tourists.

Partners and availability 
Veganz products are internationally listed in the UK, Belgium, Slovenia, Switzerland, Denmark, Austria, Czech Republic, Portugal, Singapore and South Africa. They are marketed in the following drug stores and discounters (amongst others): dm, Müller, REWE, Lidl, Globus, Kaufland, Spar, COOP, Vegasme, Whole Foods and Planet Organic.

Corporate philosophy and objectives 
Veganz strives to facilitate a plant-based, environmentally conscious lifestyle for everyone by making vegan products more accessible. This aim is expressed in the company motto "Good for you, better for everyone".  

To make the environmental and ethical impact of each good more transparent for consumers, in 2019, the company introduced a sustainability score in cooperation with the Swiss institute Eaternity. The score is shown on the package of each product and rates its integrity in four categories: climate, water, rainforest and animal protection.

Veganz won the Marketing4Future Award, a certification for creative marketing measures that break new ground in climate change.  

Additionally, as one of the first German companies, Veganz joined the "Stop Hate For Profit" campaign boycotting advertising services on all Facebook-owned platforms. The campaign raised attention for Facebook's missing initiative to fight racism and hate speech on its platforms.

See also
 List of vegetarian and vegan companies

Notes

Further reading
Pohr, Adrian. "Von Daimler Benz zum Veganismus" (video interview with Jan Bredack), Zeit Online, 29 October 2013.

External links

Supermarkets of Germany
Vegetarian companies and establishments
Companies based in Berlin
Veganism in Germany
Vegan brands